The 2022–23 Penn State Nittany Lions men's ice hockey season is the 17th season of play for the program. They will represent Penn State University in the 2022–23 NCAA Division I men's ice hockey season. This season will mark the 10th in the Big Ten Conference. They are coached by Guy Gadowsky, in his 11th season, and play their home games at Pegula Ice Arena.

Season

Departures

Recruiting

Roster
As of July 30, 2022.

Standings

Schedule and results

|-
!colspan=12 style=";" | Regular Season

|-
!colspan=12 style=";" | 

|-
!colspan=12 style=";" |

Scoring statistics

Goaltending statistics

Rankings

USCHO did not release a poll in weeks 1 and 13.

References

External links

2022-23
Penn State Nittany Lions
Penn State Nittany Lions
Penn State
Penn State